Jonas Vaiškūnas (born 6 March 1961) is a Lithuanian ethnoastronomer, religious leader, publisher and politician. He is the head of the department of ethnography at the Museum of Molėtai and priest in the Baltic neopagan organisation Romuva.

Biography
Jonas Vaiškūnas was born on 6 March 1961 in the village  in Švenčionys District Municipality. He graduated from the physics department of Vilnius University in 1984. In the 1980s he worked in the physics department at the Lithuanian Academy of Sciences. From 1990 to 1998 he worked as a researcher and museologist at the Lithuanian Museum of Ethnocosmology in Molėtai. He is the head of the Museum of Molėtai's Ethnographical Hut and Sky Observation Post, which he created in the 1990s. Since 2002 he is the director of the Archaeoastronomical Centre of the Lithuanian Academy of Sciences.

Vaiškūna has published more than 40 scientific papers and more than 400 articles of popular science. In 2010 he co-founded the online newspaper Alkas.lt, for which he became editor-in-chief in 2011. In 2012 he published a book about the Lithuanian zodiac, Skaitant dangaus ženklus. This zodiac has only survived in fragmentary attestations, which Vaiškūnas used in an attempt to reconstruct it. It is closely related to the standard Western zodiac but has culture-specific elements. Vaiškūnas has been interviewed in the Lithuanian media in his role as ethnoastronomer during calendar holidays and celestial phenomena.

He became involved in politics in 1988 when he represented the Reform Movement of Lithuania locally in Molėtai until 1991. Since 1996 he is active in the Lithuanian Nationalist and Republican Union.

Personal life
Vaiškūnas is married to the mathematician Daiva Vaiškūnienė. They have three daughters, born in 1990, 1993 and 1998.

References

External links
 Personal website 

1961 births
Living people
20th-century physicists
21st-century physicists
Museologists
Lithuanian astronomers
Lithuanian publishers (people)
Lithuanian non-fiction writers
Lithuanian modern pagans
Modern pagan religious leaders
People from Švenčionys District Municipality
20th-century Lithuanian politicians
21st-century Lithuanian politicians